Hayner William Monjardim Cordeiro (born October 2, 1995 in Salvador, Bahia), simply known as Hayner, is a Brazilian footballer who plays for Dnipro-1 on loan from Azuriz as defender.

Career statistics

Honours
 Atlético Goianiense
Campeonato Goiano: 2022

References

External links

1995 births
Living people
Brazilian footballers
Association football defenders
Esporte Clube Bahia players
Clube Náutico Capibaribe players
Paysandu Sport Club players
Grêmio Novorizontino players
Louletano D.C. players
Cuiabá Esporte Clube players
Sport Club do Recife players
Azuriz Futebol Clube players
SC Dnipro-1 players
Campeonato Brasileiro Série A players
Campeonato Brasileiro Série B players
Campeonato de Portugal (league) players
Ukrainian Premier League players
Brazilian expatriate footballers
Expatriate footballers in Portugal
Brazilian expatriate sportspeople in Portugal
Expatriate footballers in Ukraine
Brazilian expatriate sportspeople in Ukraine
Sportspeople from Salvador, Bahia